La Doctora Castañuelas is a 1950 Argentine musical comedy film directed by Luis Moglia Barth.

Cast
  María Antinea
  Roberto Airaldi
  Augusto Codecá
  Miguel Gómez Bao
  Lalo Maura
  Miriam Sucre
  Ramón J. Garay
  Francisco Pablo Donadío
  Ernesto Villegas
  Rafael Acevedo
  César Mariño
  Inés Moreno
  Alfredo Alaria
  Reynaldo Mompel
  Pablo Cumo
  Alfonso Pisano

References

External links
 

1950 films
1950s Spanish-language films
Argentine black-and-white films
Films directed by Luis Moglia Barth
Argentine musical comedy films
1950 musical comedy films
1950s Argentine films